Solveig Sørensen (born 9 August 1982) is an Australian team handball player. She plays for the Danish club Team Haderslev, and on the Australian national team. She represented Australia at the 2009 World Women's Handball Championship in China and at the 2013 World Women's Handball Championship in Serbia.

References

Australian female handball players
1982 births
Living people